As in many other sports, the premier German club competition in 10 metre air rifle and 10 metre air pistol is known as the Bundesliga. The league, open to both men and women, was created in 1997 and is administered by the German Shooting Federation. In each discipline, twenty four teams of five shooters each compete during a season spanning from October to February for the German team championship. Apart from the top German shooters, the league also attracts many shooters from other European countries, as well as a few from India and the United States, and involves a number of Olympic medalists and other shooters of international success.

League format

Match format
The Bundesliga matches mainly follow the International Shooting Sport Federation's rules for air rifle and air pistol, with the following important changes:
All shooters fire only 40 competition shots.
The sighting shots are not included in the match time. Instead there is a 15-minute sighting shot period before the match.
The match time is lowered to 50 minutes. (Only electronic targets are allowed in the Bundesliga. When in lower leagues paper targets are used, the match time is 60 minutes.)
The shooters are paired up based on previous results so that the top shooters from both teams stand next to each other, and so on down. The shooter achieving the best 40-shot result in each pair wins a point for his or her team. Ties are resolved by firing single shots as needed. Thus, a match can be won by either 5–0, 4–1 or 3–2.

The match format of the Bundesliga has been so successful that the European Shooting Confederation mirrored it when creating the ESC Youth League for national teams of young shooters.

Regular season
Each Bundesliga consists of two divisions of twelve teams each:
Northern division (Bundesliga Nord) covering Berlin, Brandenburg, Hamburg, Hesse, Mecklenburg-Vorpommern, Lower Saxony, North Rhine-Westphalia, Saxony, Saxony-Anhalt, Schleswig-Holstein, Thuringia and the northern part of Rhineland-Palatinate
Southern division (Bundesliga Süd) covering Baden-Württemberg, Bavaria, Saarland and the southern part of Rhineland-Palatinate

A single round-robin of eleven match days is conducted in each division during October–December or October–January. As shooting is a sport where the club league forms only a part of the competition season, the matches are concentrated to six weekends, organized in such a way that the clubs that placed 1–10 during the previous season have two home-range matches while the remaining two teams only have one each. In the table, teams are ranked on the number of won matches; tie-breaking criteria are 1) number of individual points won, 2) results between the concerned teams, 3) number of won points on first position (etc.).

Finals
The top four teams of each division reach the finals (Bundesligafinale), held during a single weekend in February at the same location for both air rifle and air pistol. Quarterfinals and semifinals are held on Saturday, and bronze and gold medal matches on Sunday.

Promotion and relegation
Below the Bundesliga are five regional leagues: Regionalliga Nord, Regionalliga West and Regionalliga Ost below the northern division; Regionalliga Südwest and Regionalliga Süd below the southern division. The twelfth-placed team of each Bundesliga division is automatically relegated to the appropriate regional league. The eleventh-placed team competes together with the two top teams of each regional league for two spots in next year's Bundesliga.

Below the regional leagues, there are leagues managed by each Landesverband (in northern Germany, these generally follow the state borders, while the large states in the south are divided into several Landesverbände).

Winners
The following clubs have become German champions since the inception of the Bundesliga.

Current clubs
The following clubs are qualified for the 2018–2019 season. Ranks from the previous season are in parentheses, the defending champions in bold and promoted teams in italics.

Air rifle

Air pistol

Foreign shooters
Of the five shooters entered in a match, at least four must be German citizens. Despite this rule, many prominent foreigners participate in the league. The list of foreign shooters registered for the 2018–19 season includes the following shooters (although all did not compete in every match):

Notes

References
"Landesverbände" - Deutscher Schützenbund e.V.
Ligaordnung des Deutschen Schützenbundes e.V. 2009-2010, 1 May 2009
Liste der ausländischen Sportler des Bundes- und Regionalliga Saison 2008 / 2009

External links
Official website

Shooting competitions in Germany
Sho
Shooting sports in Germany
Professional sports leagues in Germany